Same-sex marriage has been legal in Guanajuato since 20 December 2021. That day, the Secretary General of Government, Libia Dennise García Muñoz, issued an official directive addressed to officials of the state civil registry that, effective immediately, same-sex couples can marry in the state. Guanajuato became the 23rd Mexican state, and the 24th jurisdiction (as Mexico City is not a state), to legalize same-sex marriage.

Legal history

Background

On 12 June 2015, the Supreme Court of Justice of the Nation ruled that state bans on same-sex marriage are unconstitutional nationwide. The court's ruling is considered a "jurisprudential thesis" and did not invalidate state laws, meaning that same-sex couples denied the right to marry would still have to seek individual amparos in court. The ruling standardized the procedures for judges and courts throughout Mexico to approve all applications for same-sex marriages and made the approval mandatory. The court based its decision on Article 4 of the Constitution of Mexico, which respects matrimonial equality, stating that "Man and woman are equal under the law. The law shall protect the organization and development of the family."

On 2 September 2013, a lesbian couple was denied a marriage license by the civil registry office in León. The couple challenged the denial in federal court. Attorneys representing the civil registry argued that state law defined marriage as "the union of a man and a woman" and as such the couple could not marry, whereas the couple's attorneys argued that the ban was unconstitutional under the Constitution of Mexico. On 18 September 2013, a judge ruled in the couple's favor and granted them the right to marry. On 19 March 2014, the couple, who remained anonymous, became the first same-sex couple to marry in Guanajuato.

On 4 March 2014, a local deputy from the Institutional Revolutionary Party (PRI) said he would help a group of same-sex couples from León and Silao file amparos for same-sex marriage rights. An amparo for 30 couples from León was filed two weeks later. A further amparo was filed in Irapuato for several more couples later that year. On 25 November 2014, the First District Court ruled in favor of a request by a same-sex couple to marry. The state did not appeal, and the couple married in January 2015. In April 2016, officials from the civil registry said that nine same-sex couples had married in the state by that time. A tenth amparo was granted to a same-sex couple from Salamanca in August 2016. By May 2018, 43 amparos for same-sex marriage rights had been granted in the state.

Legislative action
On 21 February 2014, the Party of the Democratic Revolution (PRD) introduced a bill to the Congress of Guanajuato to amend the Civil Code to legalize same-sex marriage. The measure was endorsed by the Institutional Revolutionary Party, but on 13 April 2015 the Justice Committee of Congress with a majority from the state's ruling National Action Party (PAN) voted 3–2 to shelve the bill citing PAN's objection to same-sex unions.

On 29 April 2016, the Municipal Council of Guanajuato City voted unanimously to pass a resolution allowing a lesbian couple to marry in the municipality. The council also urged Governor Miguel Márquez Márquez to introduce legislation to legalize same-sex marriage. In October 2018, PRD Deputy Isidoro Bazaldúa Lugo introduced a same-sex marriage bill to Congress. Another bill to legalize same-sex marriage was introduced following the 2021 legislative elections. Both measures stalled and were not voted on.

On 27 October 2022, Deputy David Martínez Mendizábal of the National Regeneration Movement (MORENA) party introduced a bill to codify same-sex marriage in the Civil Code. Martínez Mendizábal said he introduced the bill because "the legal framework of our [state] remains discriminatory, because it still does not recognize the right to gender identity, equal marriage, and does not prohibit conversion therapies, among others."

Directive 2261/2021
On 20 December 2021, citing jurisprudence established by the Mexican Supreme Court, Secretary General of Government Libia Dennise García Muñoz issued an official directive, 2261/2021, addressed to all civil registry officials in Guanajuato that, effective immediately, same-sex couples can marry in the state without the further need of their first obtaining a judicial amparo. The directive states:

Activist Juan Pablo Delgado, founding member of LGBT group , welcomed the measure, saying, "Today Guanajuato joins the list of states that allow equal marriage. While the need to reform local law continues, a huge step is taken in building a society that offers equal conditions for all people. Long live diversity." Guanajuato's reputation as one of the most conservative states in Mexico was also cause for widespread media coverage that followed the Secretary's announcement. The first same-sex marriage performed under the new directive took place on 10 January 2022 in Irapuato.

On 26 January 2022, Governor Diego Sinhué Rodríguez Vallejo issued an executive decree repealing article 72 of the civil registry regulations, which had established as a requisite for marriage that the partners be of opposite sexes. The decree entered into effect that same day.

Marriage statistics
The following table shows the number of same-sex marriages performed in Guanajuato since 2021 as reported by the National Institute of Statistics and Geography.

In November 2022, the civil registry reported that more than 200 same-sex marriages had been performed in Guanajuato since legalization, with most being performed in León (54), Irapuato (36), and Guanajuato City (20). 69% of these marriages were between two women. In total, at least one same-sex marriage had taken place in 30 of the state's 46 municipalities.

Public opinion
According to a 2018 survey by the National Institute of Statistics and Geography, 39% of the Guanajuato public opposed same-sex marriage.

See also
 Same-sex marriage in Mexico
 LGBT rights in Mexico

Notes

References

Guanajuato
Guanajuato
2021 in LGBT history